The siege of Zbarazh was a 1649 battle of the Khmelnytsky Uprising. The Polish–Lithuanian Commonwealth forces held their positions besieged in the Zbarazh Castle until in the aftermath of Battle of Zboriv and the Treaty of Zboriv the hostilities paused and the siege ended. These events were described by Henryk Sienkiewicz in his novel With Fire and Sword (1884).

Background
In the first half of 1649, the Polish–Lithuanian Commonwealth negotiations with the rebellious Cossacks fell through, and the Polish-Lithuanian military begun gathering near the borders with the insurgent-held Ukraine. While the king organized the main Polish army, and Janusz Radziwill commanded the Lithuanian army along the Horyn River, an army under three regimentarzs (Andrzej Firlej, Stanisław Lanckoroński and Mikołaj Ostroróg) was located in Zbarazh from 30 June, where prince Jeremi Wiśniowiecki would arrive with reinforcements on 7 July. Wiśniowiecki's arrival raised the morale of the royal army, and despite having no official rank, both the common soldiers and the new regimentarz promised to heed his advice, and even offered him the official command (which he however refused).

Opposing forces
Zbarazh Castle was rebuilt in the decades preceding the siege under the Netherland engineer Henryk van Peene, who finished his project in 1626. The castle was built as a square, which each side of about 88 meters, and surrounded by an earthen wall and a moat. It was a relatively modern and resilient construction, whose major weakness was its small size, and correspondingly, little space for any extensive army and required supplies. Built with the Tatar raids in mind, it was not meant to withstand a prolonged siege by a large army. The town itself had relatively poor defenses. The Polish-Lithuanian fortified camp incorporated the town defenses and the castle.

The Polish-Lithuanian forces numbered between 9,000 and 15,000, according to different sources, and Widecki notes that the lower number accounts for regular troops, whereas the higher one probably counts auxiliary troops such as armed servants and the town militia.

The Polish-Lithuanian forces were commanded officially by Andrzej Firlej. However, as noted by Polish historian Widacki, Firlej had little authority, and often listened to Wiśniowiecki's advice, who could be seen as the real commander of the Polish-Lithuanian forces. As a contemporary memoir notes, Wiśniowiecki's position was enough to veto a plan proposed and backed by all three regimentarzs. Each of the regimentarz, as well as prince Wiśniowiecki, commanded a division of the troops, tasked with defending a part of the line; there were five divisions in total, with the last one commanded by chorąży Aleksander Koniecpolski.

The forces of the allied Zaporozhian Cossacks and Crimean Tatars at Zbarazh numbered around 300,000 – with two thirds of those being Cossacks, and the remaining hundred thousands, the Tatars. Widecki notes that the number of 70,000 Cossacks given by some sources may be true in so far as it reflects the size of the seasoned, regular Cossack troops, with the remaining 130,000 reflecting the size of the Cossack militia and rebellious peasants. Those forces were commanded by the Cossack leader, Bohdan Khmelnytsky, and Tatar khan İslâm III Giray.

Siege
On 7 July first skirmishes began, and by 10 July the advanced forces of the Cossacks and Tatars arrived at Zbarzah, killing or taking prisoner several thousands of auxiliary Polish-Lithuanian troops which were still gathering supplies in the area, and failed to retreat to the main camp before being overrun. The first skirmish near the main camp, however, resulted in the Polish-Lithuanian victory, as the Cossack and Tatar forces were thrown back, which raised the defenders morale.

The defenders defeated the attacker main force assaults on 11, 13, 14, 16 and 17 July. After the failure of those early assaults, the Cossack and Tatar army began a regular siege, constructing their own field fortifications, and intensifying the artillery bombardment of the Polish-Lithuanian camp. On 23 July a short ceasefire occurred, as the sides attempted negotiations, eventually futile; other attempts at negotiations took place on 26 and 28 July. On 16 and 23 July there were assaults on the town, where the only well was located, and both were defeated. The Cossacks also tried to destroy a nearby dam to flood the town, but the dam was also successfully defended.

Throughout the engagement, the Polish-Lithuanian forces constructed additional field fortifications, and retreated behind them, to reduce the length of the walls they would have to defend; while retreating to the fourth line of defences on 30 July they defeated another enemy assault.

As the defenders were running low on supplies, about 4,000 starving auxiliaries (servants) requested to leave the city; they were granted permission, but soon after leaving the town walls they were taken captive by the Tatars; some were taken into jasyr while others were executed on the spot. Despite that, others wanted to leave the town, but prince Wiśniowiecki promised to feed them rather than risk another massacre. The besieged also tried to send messages to the king asking for reinforcements, and in early August a volunteer messenger, Mikołaj Skrzetuski, managed to sneak past the besiegers and reached the king around 6 or 7 August; he would later inspire the fictional character Jan Skrzetuski in Henryk Sienkiewicz's The Trilogy. In the meantime, the Cossack and Tatars would try to extend their fortifications closer to the defender's line; they launched their last large assault on 6 August, but were defeated once more. Soon afterward the Cossack and Tatar sent off a large chunk of their forces under Bohdan Khmelnytsky to intercept the nearing royal reinforcements under John II Casimir at Zboriv; the resulting battle ended in the Treaty of Zboriv of 17 August. In the meantime, at Zbarazh, the besiegers even managed to successfully dig a tunnel into the Polish-Lithuanian camp around 16 August, but it was destroyed by the defenders.

Around 20 August, the besieged launched a small counterattack, leaving the camp and raiding the enemy; soon afterward, on 21 August, Khmelnytsky returned, and despite having signed the peace treaty, he attempted the last final assault on Zbarazh.

Aftermath
The ceasefire would take hold on the next day, although the Cossacks would demand a ransom, at the same time selling the besieged some badly needed supplies; in the end a ransom of 40,000 talars was paid, the Cossack and Tatar field fortifications were mostly abandoned by the 23rd, and by the 25th the besieging army left the vicinity of Zbarazh. The Polish-Lithuanian army left on the evening of that day, reaching Tarnopol on the 28th.

The Polish-Lithuanian losses at Zbarazh were about 2,000 regular soldiers and 4,000 auxiliaries; about half of the losses were a result of diseases.

Further reading
 Kaczmarczyk, J. Bohdan Khmelnytsky. Wroclaw-Warsaw-Cracow-Lodz 1988.
 Krypiakevych, I. Bohdan Khmelnytsky. Lviv 1990.
 Smoliy, V., Stepankov, V. Bohdan Khmelnytsky: Social-political portrait. Kiev 1995.

References

External links
 Dzyra, Ya. Siege of Zbarazh 1649. Encyclopedia of History of Ukraine. "Naukova Dumka". Kiev 2005
 Siege of Zbarazh 1649. Ukrainian Soviet Encyclopedia.

Conflicts in 1649
Zbarazh
Zbarazh
1649 in Europe
Zbarazh